Matt Irving (born Glasgow, Scotland; 16 March 1950 – 3 April 2015) was a Scottish musician (keyboards, accordion, bass guitar, vocals).

Irving was the bass guitar player for Manfred Mann's Earth Band between 1981 and 1986. He featured on the albums Somewhere in Afrika and Budapest Live. Since leaving the band he has guested (on keyboards) with The Lords of the New Church, Squeeze, Chris Rea, Paul Young and ex Pink Floyd mainman Roger Waters. He also wrote the song "Some Conversation"' on the Wishbone Ash album Strange Affair. He shared lead vocals with John Waite in "Time On My Hands", an early song by The Babys.

He was also an integral part of the Tex-Mex band Los Pacaminos on vocals, keyboards and accordion.

Irving died in 2015 due to prostate cancer.

References

1950 births
2015 deaths
Musicians from Glasgow
Scottish keyboardists
Scottish bass guitarists
Manfred Mann's Earth Band members
Los Pacaminos members
Deaths from prostate cancer